The Empire Award for Best Actor is an Empire Award presented annually by the British film magazine Empire to honor an actor who has delivered an outstanding performance in a leading role while working within the film industry. The Empire Award for Best Actor is one of five ongoing awards which were first introduced at the 1st Empire Awards ceremony in 1996 (the others being Best Actress, Best Director, Best Film and Best British Film) with Nigel Hawthorne receiving the award for his role in The Madness of King George. Winners are voted by the readers of Empire magazine.

Since its inception, the award has been given to 18 actors. Johnny Depp and James McAvoy have received the most awards in this category with two awards each. Johnny Depp was nominated on five occasions, more than any other actor. Hugh Jackman is the most recent winner in this category for his role in Logan.

Winners and nominees
In the list below, winners are listed first in the colored row in boldface, followed by the other nominees. The number of the ceremony (1st, 2nd, etc.) appears in parentheses after the awards year, linked to the article (if any) on that ceremony.

1990s

2000s

2010s

Multiple awards and nominations

Multiple awards
, the following individuals received two or more Best Actor awards:

Multiple nominations
, the following individuals received two or more Best Actor nominations:

Notes

References

External links

Actor
Film awards for lead actor